Krisztián Brunczvik (born 25 September 1989) is a Slovak football midfielder of Hungarian ethnicity who currently plays for the Corgoň Liga club FK DAC 1904 Dunajská Streda.

External links
Eurofotbal.cz profile

References

1989 births
Living people
Slovak footballers
Association football midfielders
FC DAC 1904 Dunajská Streda players
MŠK Novohrad Lučenec players
Slovak Super Liga players